The Columbia Correctional Institution (CCI) is an adult male maximum-security correctional facility operated by the Wisconsin Department of Corrections Division of Adult Institutions in Portage, Columbia County, Wisconsin. The operating capacity is 541. The average daily population for fiscal year 2018 was 830. Larry Fuchs, the warden, has been in that position since April 2020.

History 
It has an area of  inside the perimeter fence. Columbia Correctional Institution opened in May 1986, with an original capacity of 450 inmates housed in single bed cells. In 1997, a 150-bed barracks was constructed for minimum security inmates and over time many of the single bed cells have been converted to double bed cells.

In 1988, a sculpture entitled Chromatic Fragments—Vortex to the Sky by artist and University of Illinois Professor of Art Christiane Martens was installed in the parking area of the prison.

In 2007, a female staff member was accused of having sex with inmates at the prison. She pleaded no contest to a lesser charge. In 2008, a female corrections officer was charged with multiple counts of second degree sexual assault. The use of force was not alleged in either situation, but Wisconsin law does not allow prisoners to consent to sex with prison staff. Punishment can be up to 40 years in prison, and a large fine.

In 2020, two inmates escaped from the maximum security portion of the prison. While one of the security fences was supposed to be an electric "Stun Fence", it was not operational at the time. In addition, possibly due to act 10 and short staffing, all but one of the five watch towers meant to watch the fence were unmanned at the time of the escape. Both inmates managed to make it over both fences and make it all the way to Illinois before being captured.

Buildings and grounds

CCI has 12 total housing units, 6 general population, 2 SMU (Special Management Unit [psych]), 2 segregation (plus one housing unit is half for SMU seg and reception and orientation houses min/med security seg if not put to DS2 or DS1), 1 × 150 bed barracks, 1 × 13 cell R&O (Reception & Orientation). The facility is stated to have ten living areas with 50 cells each and a 150-bed barracks.

High-profile inmates 
Some notorious individuals who have been incarcerated at CCI include:

 Filemon Amaro, Waukesha County courtroom shootout in 1978 that killed two sheriff's deputies.

Murdered
 Jesse Anderson (1957–1994), murderer; beaten to death
 Jeffrey Dahmer (1960–1994), serial killer; beaten to death

Current
 Joseph Hunter, contract killer

Former
 Brendan Dassey (born 1989) is an American convicted murderer.
 James Oswald, Convicted of a crime spree in the mid-1990s that included kidnapping, bank robberies, wounding two officers and killing Waukesha police captain James Lutz
 Christopher Scarver (born 1969), convicted murderer who while in prison killed Jeffrey Dahmer and Jesse Anderson

See also

References

External links
 Columbia Correctional Institution
 Photos - CCI During Construction
 Wisconsin Department of Corrections

1986 establishments in Wisconsin
Buildings and structures in Columbia County, Wisconsin
Portage, Wisconsin
Prisons in Wisconsin